Kalak Dinar (also Romanized as Kalak Dīnār; also known as Kalleh Dīnār) is a village in Kuh Sefid Rural District, in the Central District of Khash County, Sistan and Baluchestan Province, Iran. At the 2006 census, its population was 29, in 5 families.

References 

Populated places in Khash County